Mersim Beskovic (born October 16, 1978) is an American retired professional soccer player.

Playing career 
Beskovic was drafted by the Tampa Bay Mutiny in the fifth round of the 2001 MLS SuperDraft with the 55th pick.

Statistics

References

External links 
 Profile on MetroFanatic

1978 births
Living people
People from Plav, Montenegro
Sportspeople from the Bronx
Soccer players from New York City
American soccer players
Long Island Rough Riders players
New York Red Bulls players
Westchester Flames players
Association football defenders
St. Francis College alumni
A-League (1995–2004) players
Major League Soccer players
Tampa Bay Mutiny draft picks
St. Francis Brooklyn Terriers men's soccer players